Body Offering may refer to:
Body Offering (novel), 2013 novel by Makarand Paranjape
"Body Offering", a 2008 single by The Alice Rose